Albert  "Tub" Paul Epperly (May 7, 1918 – April 14, 2003) was a pitcher in Major League Baseball. He played in nine games for the Chicago Cubs in 1938. While he was with the Cubs, Epperly wore uniform number 56, had eight at-bats, two hits, one double, and two runs. He pitched five games for the Brooklyn Dodgers in 1950 wearing number 11 on his jersey. He worked for the sheriff's office in Scott County, Iowa from 1954 to 1984. He died at the age of 84, in McFarland, Wisconsin, where he lived with his daughter, and is buried in Davenport Memorial Park, Davenport, Iowa.

References

External links

Major League Baseball pitchers
Brooklyn Dodgers players
Chicago Cubs players
1918 births
2003 deaths
Baseball players from Iowa
Eau Claire Bears players
Moline Plow Boys players
Indianapolis Indians players
Milwaukee Brewers (minor league) players
Los Angeles Angels (minor league) players
San Francisco Seals (baseball) players
Montreal Royals players
St. Paul Saints (AA) players
Richmond Virginians (minor league) players
San Antonio Missions players
People from Carroll County, Iowa
People from McFarland, Wisconsin